Khoshkkan (also Romanized as Khoshkkān) is a village in Karghond Rural District, Nimbeluk District, Qaen County, South Khorasan Province, Iran. At the 2006 census, its population was 275, in 71 families.

References 

Populated places in Qaen County